Robinsonův ostrov 2018 was the second season of the Czech version of Swedish television series Expedition Robinson. The season will premiere on 5 February 2018. Nineteen contestants will compete for an unknown number of days to try and win 2,500,000 CZK. The main twist this season is that the tribes are divided by their gender. In addition, after the first challenge of the season, the leaders of both tribes were told to make new tribes. The person who was not picked for either tribe was eliminated from the game.

Finishing order

Finishing order 

* Mirek mirek bought immunity in the auction.

Voting history

References

External links

Czech
2018 Czech television seasons
Czech reality television series
Television shows filmed in the Philippines